Iván Menéndez Candela (born 3 September 1978 in Avilés, Asturias) is a Spanish retired footballer who played as a left back.

In a 16-year senior career, he played almost exclusively in the lower leagues. His professional input consisted of 21 games for SD Ponferradina in the 2010–11 season, in an eventual relegation from Segunda División.

External links

1978 births
Living people
People from Avilés
Spanish footballers
Footballers from Asturias
Association football defenders
Segunda División players
Segunda División B players
Tercera División players
Real Avilés CF footballers
Zamora CF footballers
RCD Mallorca B players
Gimnástica de Torrelavega footballers
CD Puertollano footballers
Granada CF footballers
SD Ponferradina players
Real Oviedo players